The Senator Ken Maddy Stakes is a Listed American Thoroughbred horse race for fillies and mares, two years old and older over a distance of five furlongs on the turf course scheduled in early November at Del Mar Racetrack in Del Mar, California.

History

The event was inaugurated on 8 October 1969, opening day of the Oak Tree Racing Association meeting at Santa Anita Park as the Autumn Days Stakes, an allowance stakes for age three and older of either sex over the Downhill turf course at a distance of about  furlongs. The event was the first stakes race and first turf race ever run by the Oak Tree Racing Association and was won by Elizabeth Keck's entry Tell who was ridden by US Hall of Fame jockey Bill Shoemaker defeating his stablemate Pinjara by one length in a time of 1:13. The following year, in 1970 the event was run as a handicap, Autumn Days Handicap and was won by the US Hall of Fame Champion Ack Ack who carried an imposing weight of 128 pounds as top weight to victory by  lengths over Fleet Surprise.

In 1971 the conditions of the event were changed to a fillies and mares race. When the grading of races began as a Thoroughbred Owners and Breeders Association project in 1973 the event was classified as Grade III. The event would hold Grade III status for one more year before being downgrade to Listed until 1998 when it again was classified as Grade III. 

In 1999 the race was renamed to honor the long-serving California State Senator Kenneth L. Maddy for his support of thoroughbred racing. Senator Kenneth L. Maddy was elected into the California Racing Hall of Fame in 2007. 

In 2010, Oak Tree's meeting was moved to Hollywood Park and the race was shortened to six furlongs due to Hollywood Park's course configuration. In 2017 the event was held at Del Mar Racetrack over the five furlongs distance.

The event has been run in split divisions eight times with the last such occurrence in 1986.

In 2021 the event was downgraded to a Listed event.  Also the event was moved from Santa Anita and scheduled as an undercard event on the Breeders' Cup program at Del Mar Racetrack.

Records
Speed  record: 
 furlongs: 1:02.03 – Biddy Duke  (2020) 
about  furlongs:  1:11.56 – Elusive Diva (2005)

Margins: 
  lengths - Palmistry  (1979)

Most wins:
 2 – Bel's Starlet (1991, 1992)
 2 – Belleski (2003, 2004)
 2 – Broken Dreams (2011, 2012)

Most wins by an owner:
 7 – Ann & Jerry Moss (1984, 1985, 1987, 1996, 2001, 2003, 2004)

Most wins by a jockey:
 6 – Kent Desormeaux (1991, 1992, 1993, 1994, 1998, 2000)

Most wins by a trainer:
 6 – Richard E. Mandella (1982, 1991, 1992, 1996, 2001, 2015)

Winners

Legend:

 
 

Notes:

§ Ran as an entry

† In the 1978 running of the Second Division of the event, Sweet Little Lady was first past the post but was disqualified for interference in the straight and Country Queen was declared the winner.

See also
List of American and Canadian Graded races

References

Turf races in the United States
Horse races in California
Graded stakes races in the United States
Grade 3 stakes races in the United States
Open sprint category horse races
Recurring sporting events established in 1969
Santa Anita Park
1969 establishments in California